Daisy Kyaw Win is a Burmese actress who won the Myanmar Academy Award in the 1971 film Arr Nwae Thu Par Shin. The 1964 film Maung Mu Paing Shin made her rise in popularity.
 
Her parents Kyaw Win and Tin Tin Mu also won the academy awards in 1952 and 1965 respectively; hence they became the first and only academy-winning family in history.

Filmography
The following is the list of some well-known films starred by Daisy Kyaw Win.
Hna Yauk Htae Nay Chin Tal (1962)
Maung Mu Paing Shin (1964)
Banto Lu Kalay Hnint Thuzar (1968)
The Thaung Yan Hmar Ma Khwar Yet Naing Tal (1968)
Pa Yin Yaung (1969)
Ngo Ywae Yal Ywae Ma Ya Thaw Myat Nar (1969)
Kyun Ma Mhar Main Ma Thar (1970)
Arr Nwe Thu Par Shin (1971)
Hmae Ta Pout (1973)
Chit Han Saung Mone Thu Moh Lar (1977)

Awards and nominations

References

20th-century Burmese actresses
Living people
Burmese film actresses
Year of birth missing (living people)